Warren V. Woody Sr. (October 13, 1897 – December 21, 1982) was an American football coach. He was the head football coach at Sterling College in Sterling, Kansas for three seasons, from 1922 to 1924 compiling a record of 17–7–2.

Woody played for the Kansas Jayhawks in Lawrence, Kansas, lettering in 1916, 1917, and 1920. He was instrumental among alumni in establishing a recurring and philanthropic connection between his alma mater and the state of Illinois. He died in Skokie, Illinois in 1982 after an illness.

Head coaching record

References

1897 births
1982 deaths
Kansas Jayhawks football players
Sterling Warriors football coaches
People from Sterling, Kansas